The 2004–05 British National League season was the ninth and final season of the British National League, the second level of ice hockey in Great Britain. Seven teams participated in the league, and the Dundee Stars won the championship.

Regular season

Playoffs

First round

Semifinals 
 Dundee Stars - Bracknell Bees 3:3 (2:1 SO), 5:5 (1:0 SO)
 Guildford Flames - Fife Flyers 1:3, 3:1, 6:3

Final 
 Dundee Stars - Guildford Flames 4:0, 5:2, 3:2

External links 
 Season on hockeyarchives.info

British National League (1996–2005) seasons
United
2004–05 in British ice hockey